

Matthew Beaumont is a British novelist and former copywriter.

Beaumont made his debut in 2000 with the comic novel, e. The Novel of Liars, Lunch and Lost Knickers, which consists entirely of e-mails composed by the staff of one advertising office. A recent example of an epistolary novel, it is generally recognised as one of the first e-mail novels.

For the BBC, Beaumont created the storyline of the alternate reality game, Jamie Kane (2005).

Novels

e (2000)
The e Before Christmas (2000)
The Book, the Film, the T-shirt (2002)
Staying Alive (2004)
Where There's a Will (2007)
Small World (2008)
e Squared (2009)

See also
Carl Steadman's "Two Solitudes", a 1995 e-mail story
List of contemporary epistolary novels.

References

External links
Let's Talk About Me, the official web site for Maria and Matt Beaumont
An interview with Matt Beaumont from bookmunch.co.ok

Year of birth missing (living people)
Living people
20th-century British novelists
21st-century British novelists